There were two Battles of Breitenfeld during the Thirty Years' War:
 Battle of Breitenfeld (1631)
 Battle of Breitenfeld (1642)